Arenaria libanotica, commonly known as Lebanon sandwort, is a species of flowering plant in the family Caryophyllaceae. This species was first described by Kotschy in 1867.

Arenaria libanotica blooms in June and July; its small flowers are white and hermaphrodite flowers. It is endemic to the mountains of Lebanon and is found in parts of Palestine / Israel.

References

Flora of Lebanon
libanotica